Killaloo ( or Cill Dhalua meaning "Dalua's church") is a townland and hamlet in County Londonderry, Northern Ireland. It is about six miles southeast of Derry, on the main Derry to Belfast road. In the 2001 Census Killaloo had a population of 75 people. It is situated within Derry and Strabane district.

The nearest shops and amenities are in the village of Claudy, to the southeast.

Places of interest 

 The ruins of Brackfield Bawn are beside the main road.
 The Ness Woods country park is popular during summer months.

References

External links 
NI Neighbourhood Information System
Culture Northern Ireland

Villages in County Londonderry
Derry and Strabane district